Albert Karaziwan (born 1958) is a Syrian-Belgian businessman who owns and operates Semlex Group, a Belgian identification document and device production company notable for supplying over a dozen African nations with passports or other ID documents.

Albert Karaziwan was made a special advisor to the president and the Ambassador-at-large for the Gulf countries by its former president Ahmed Abdallah Sambi, and held three Comoros diplomatic passports which were cancelled under president Azali Assoumani.

In January 2018, Belgian police searched Albert Karaziwan's home in relation to an investigation by the Belgian federal prosecutor of a case of possible money laundering and corruption.

Background 
Albert Karaziwan was born in 1958 in Aleppo, Syria and is one of eight children. In 1980, he moved to Belgium to study. He began his career in the diamond business in Antwerp, and made his fortune by assisting a Finnish businessman to invest in Brussels real estate. In 1992, he founded Semlex Group in Brussels, and opened a branch in Dublin, Ireland in 1998.

From the early 2000s, Semlex Group won contracts to make biometric documents for governments around the world, including the United Nations, European Union, and international police agencies.

References 

21st-century Belgian businesspeople
People from Aleppo
1958 births
Living people